James Timothy Barry Coombes (born 27 May 1996) is a Gibraltarian footballer who plays for Bruno's Magpies and the Gibraltar national team. Mainly a striker, he can also play as an attacking midfielder. His cousin is Magpies teammate and defender Lee Coombes.

Club career
Coombes began his career with cousin Lee at Europa, playing for them in their first season in the UEFA Europa League. Despite attracting the attention of several clubs from England and France, Coombes opted to sign for Manchester 62 in 2015, scoring four goals in an ultimately unsuccessful season at the club. He left in summer 2016 to study in Cardiff, and in February 2017 signed for Welsh Football League Division One team Undy Athletic while continuing his studies. On 17 August 2017, he signed for Lincoln Red Imps, and was immediately loaned back to Undy for the coming season. After a stop-start season plagued by injury, he scored his first Undy goal on 16 December, the winner in a 3–2 victory against Pen-y-Bont.

In August 2018, he moved to West Didsbury & Chorlton, joining up with compatriot Jack Sergeant, with whom he shared a house in Hulme while studying business management at Manchester Metropolitan University. Although he signed in August, he did not receive clearance until October. He scored his first goal for West on 15 December 2018, at Whitchurch Alport to give his side the lead in a 2–0 win. He re-joined Lincoln Red Imps on 20 June 2019. He scored his first goal for the club in an 8–0 win over a depleted Glacis United side on 22 August.

In summer 2021 he signed for Bruno's Magpies, scoring his first goal on 20 November, the decisive goal in a 3–2 win over Lions Gibraltar.

International career
Coombes was first called up to the Gibraltar senior team in May 2015 for matches against Croatia and Germany. He made his international début with Gibraltar on 7 June 2015 in a 4–0 loss to Croatia. He returned to the senior team in March 2017 against Bosnia, yet did not play, however he remained in the squad in June 2017 against Cyprus, while simultaneously receiving his first call up for the newly formed Gibraltar national under-21 football team.

Day Job 
When Jamie is not on the field, he is actively fighting Financial Crime through his work as a supervisor of Financial Services firms.

Career statistics

References

External links
 
 

1996 births
Living people
Gibraltarian footballers
Gibraltar international footballers
Gibraltarian expatriate footballers
Association football forwards
Europa F.C. players
Lincoln Red Imps F.C. players
Manchester 62 F.C. players
Undy A.F.C. players
Gibraltar Premier Division players
West Didsbury & Chorlton A.F.C. players
Gibraltar under-21 international footballers
Gibraltar youth international footballers
F.C. Bruno's Magpies players
Gibraltarian expatriate sportspeople in Wales
Gibraltarian expatriate sportspeople in England
Expatriate footballers in England
Expatriate footballers in Wales